Kiyama Island is an uninhabited island of Amami Islands of Satsunan Islands, Japan, administratively belonging to Setouchi, Ōshima District, Kagoshima Prefecture. It is just 300 meters from Ukejima and can be reached by a jeep track from Ukeamuro town on Ukejima. There is a diving and fishing spot and a beach on the island.

See also

 Desert island
 List of islands

References

 
Islands of Kagoshima Prefecture
Satsunan Islands
Uninhabited islands of Japan